The Country Bear Jamboree is an attraction in the Magic Kingdom theme park at the Walt Disney World Resort and at Tokyo Disneyland in the Tokyo Disney Resort. The attraction also existed at Disneyland Park. All versions of the attraction are similar.

The attraction is a stage show featuring audio-animatronic figures. Most of the characters are bears who perform country music. Characters rise up to the stage on platforms, descend from the ceiling, and appear from behind curtains. The audience includes audio-animatronic animal heads mounted on the walls who interact with characters on stage.

Due to overwhelming popularity, The Country Bear Jamboree was given a "spin-off" show which appeared during the 1984 winter season at Walt Disney World and Disneyland. It was called The Country Bear Christmas Special. In 1986 it was given a summertime version called The Country Bear Vacation Hoedown. This version was so popular at Disneyland that it became the park's permanent edition until the attraction's closing in 2001.
 
In 2002, a movie titled The Country Bears was released which was based on the attraction and its characters.

History
The Country Bear Jamboree was originally intended by Walt Disney to be placed at Disney's Mineral King Ski Resort in California which he was trying to build in the mid 1960s. Disney knew he wanted some sort of show to provide entertainment to the guests at the resort, and he knew he wanted the show to feature some sort of bear band.  The project was assigned to imagineer Marc Davis.

Davis, together with Al Bertino, came up with many bear groups, including bear marching bands, bear mariachi bands, and Dixieland bears. One day Davis was working on drawings of the characters in his office. Disney walked in and saw the drawings and laughed because he loved the characters. On Disney's way out he turned to Davis and said good-bye, which he was known never to say. That was the last time Davis saw Disney, who died a few days later on December 15, 1966.

After his death, plans for the show still carried on. The bears would be featured in the resort's Bear Band Restaurant Show, and it was decided that they would have a country twang. But while plans for the show progressed, plans for the ski resort did not. Instead, the Imagineers working on the project decided to place the show in Walt Disney World's Magic Kingdom in time for its grand opening in 1971. Imagineer X Atencio and musical director George Bruns created songs for the bears to sing.

On October 1, 1971, The Country Bear Jamboree opened its doors in the Magic Kingdom at Walt Disney World. It received so much positive feedback that Imagineers immediately planned to make a replica of the show to be placed in Disneyland. The addition to the show in Disneyland inspired a brand-new land appropriately titled Bear Country. Because of the tremendous popularity of the show in Walt Disney World, excess capacity was added to the Disneyland incarnation in the form of two identical theaters, each housing a copy of the show in its entirety. The Disneyland version of the attraction opened on March 4, 1972. Due to the huge popularity of the Disneyland and Magic Kingdom versions a third version of the attraction was planned to open at Tokyo Disneyland on April 15, 1983. The Tokyo Version also houses two identical theaters, like the Disneyland version, and uses better more modern audio animatronics which look more realistic than the Magic Kingdom and Disneyland versions.

During the 1984 holiday season was the debut of the Country Bear Christmas Special at the Magic Kingdom and Disneyland Resort.

In 1986, the Vacation Hoedown debuted at both Disneyland (February) and the Magic Kingdom (May). Attendance struggled during the Vacation Hoedown's run in Florida, so for Magic Kingdom's 20th anniversary in 1992, the original show returned to rotate with the Christmas show as it had since 1984.

On August 24, 2001, it was announced that the Disneyland location would close on September 9 to make room for The Many Adventures of Winnie the Pooh.

The Country Bear Christmas Special was the first time an attraction at any Disney theme park became interchangeable during the year. The Country Bear Vacation Hoedown was added a little over 1-1/2 year later. Both the Country Bear Christmas Special and The Country Bear Vacation Hoedown were created, directed, and animated by Dave Feiten and Mike Sprout. The Tokyo Disneyland version of the attraction still features all three versions of the show at different times of the year.

On August 21, 2012, the Walt Disney World version of the Country Bear Jamboree closed for a nearly two-month-long refurbishment. All the characters in the show received new skin, fur, and costumes. The songs "Pretty Little Devilish Mary" and "Fractured Folk Song" and some of the dialogues were removed, while other songs were shortened. The show is now 4 to 5 minutes shorter than it was before.  The shorter version of the show opened on October 17, 2012.

Characters

Bears

Henry – The Master of Ceremonies of the show, Henry is a welcoming and friendly brown bear. He wears a grey top hat, starched shirt front, and a string tie. In some parts of the show, he plays a yellow guitar. It is implied that he and Teddi have some sort of backstage romance. Voiced by Peter Renaday.

In the movie, he is voiced Kevin Michael Richardson.

Liver Lips McGrowl – Liver Lips gets his name from his very large lips. He is a brown bear and plays the guitar. Since Florida's 2012 refurbishment, he has a messy, unkempt head of long hair in the Florida version of the show. He is voiced by Jimmy Stoneman.

Wendell – Wendell is a hyperactive golden brown bear who plays the mandolin. He wears a blue bandanna around his neck and a light brown hat. He also has a massive overbite and buck teeth. He is voiced by Bill Cole. Wendell's role in the Florida version of the show was severely reduced during the October 2012 refurb when "Fractured Folk Song" was removed, and is no longer mentioned by name.

Teddi Berra – Teddi Berra is a unique bear because she never appears on stage. Instead she descends from a hole in the ceiling on her swing, which is decorated with pink roses. She is a brown bear and wears a blue hat with a pink feather (In 2012 of the Florida version of the show, she received a new violet sequined hat) as well as a long pink boa around her neck. She is voiced by Patsy Stoneman.

Ernest – Ernest is a brown bear who plays the fiddle. He wears a derby and a red polka-dot bowtie around his neck. He was voiced by Van Stoneman from October 1971 until July 1975, when his vocals were rerecorded by Randy Sparks. Stoneman's recording can still be heard on the 1971 record and 2003 CD.

Terrence (aka Shaker) – A tall bear with tan fur, Terrence wears a hat, a yellow vest (Since Florida's 2012 refurb), and plays the guitar. He is voiced by Van Stoneman.

Trixie – Trixie is a very large brown bear who wears a blue bow on her head, a blue tutu around her waist, and holds a blue handkerchief in her left hand. She also has a slight crush on Henry. She is voiced by Cheryl Poole.

Big Al – Big Al is the fattest bear. He is grey with a light grey belly (Though his fur was changed to brown in 2012 in the Florida version of the show) and wears a tan hat and a red vest. He plays an always out-of-tune guitar and is voiced by Tex Ritter from his hit album, Blood on the Saddle (1960).

The Sun Bonnet Trio
 Bunny – Bunny stands in the center of the stage. She is voiced by Jackie Ward. Because she and her sisters are triplets, they all have brown fur and wear matching blue bonnets and dresses.
 Bubbles – Bubbles stands to the audience's left between Gomer and Bunny, and is voiced by Loulie Jean Norman.
 Beulah – Beulah stands to the audience's right and is voiced by Peggy Clark.

Gomer – Gomer is a bear who never sings but instead plays his piano, which has a honeycomb on top of it. He is considered Henry's right-hand bear. He was originally brown, but during the Florida 2012 refurbishment his appearance changed and he is now a deep burgundy red with a blonde goatee and a new hat.

The Five Bear Rugs
 Zeke – Considered the leader of The Five Bear Rugs, Zeke plays a banjo and taps on the dishpan with "a real ol' country beat". He is a grey bear with glasses who wears a tan top hat. He was voiced by Dallas McKennon from October 1971 until July 1975, when Randy Sparks rerecorded his vocals. McKennon's recording as Zeke can still be heard on the 1971 record and the 2003 CD. Zeke's solo song "Pretty Little Devilish Mary" was removed from the Florida version of the show in October 2012.
 Zeb – Zeb is brown bear with a light brown stomach. He plays the fiddle as well as wears a bandanna around his neck and a derby hat. He is voiced by a member of the Stoneman family.
 Ted – Ted is a tall, skinny bear who blows on the cornjug and plays the washboard. His fur is brown, and he wears a vest with a brown hat.
 Fred – The biggest of the five bears, Fred ironically plays the smallest instrument: the mouthharp. He is a brown bear and wears blue jeans held up with suspenders as well as a striped red and white tie.
 Tennessee – Tennessee Bear plays "The Thing" (an upright bass with only one string and a tiny bird sitting on it). He is blonde bear (brown in Tokyo Disneyland) and wears a bandanna around his neck. He is voiced by a member of the Stoneman family.

Baby Oscar – Oscar appears with The Five Bear Rugs, but plays no instrument. In fact, he never says a word. He is a brown bear and always has his teddy bear to keep him company. In the 1971 album, it is mentioned that Zeb is his father.

Other Animals

Buff – Buff is considered the leader of the mounted animal heads and is also the largest. He is the head portion of an American bison. He is voiced by Disney legend Thurl Ravenscroft.

Max – Max is the head portion of a whitetail buck and is voiced by Peter Renaday.

Melvin – Melvin, a bull moose head, is of the animal head trio. He often makes good-natured jokes and is voiced by Bill Lee.

Sammy – Sammy is Henry's raccoon pal who cuddles around Henry's top hat. He acts like a coonskin cap for Henry. He is voiced by Bill Cole. In the Country Bear Vacation Hoedown, Sammy gets replaced by a skunk named Randy.

At Disneyland, Max, Buff, and Melvin currently reside in The Many Adventures of Winnie the Pooh, which replaced the Country Bear Playhouse in 2003 (which had closed nearly two years prior). They hang above the entrance to the "Hunny Heaven" room, but riders must turn around in order to see them. The set of Max, Buff & Melvin featured there were the Audio-Animatronic figures found in one of the shows.

At the Magic Kingdom and Tokyo Disneyland the three trophy heads of Max, Buff and Melvin hung on the right side of the theatre but at Disneyland they hung on the left side.

The Tokyo Disneyland and the Former Disneyland versions of the show houses 2 theatres. The Magic Kingdom version only houses 1 theatre.

The Show
The show is basically a continuous string of short country songs sung by the various bears. As each bear sings their song, a curtain opens to reveal them, except in the case of Wendell, Gomer, and the Sun Bonnet Trio (all of whom rise from the center stage), and Teddi Barra (who descends from the ceiling).

The show begins with Max, Buff, and Melvin telling Henry to get on with the show. Henry then asks Gomer to give him a "little intro", and the jamboree begins.

The Songs
Walt Disney World version:
 "Pianjo"  – Gomer and Henry
 "Bear Band Serenade"  – The Five Bear Rugs, Gomer, and Henry
 "If You Can't Bite, Don't Growl"  – Ernest and the Five Bear Rugs
 "My Woman Ain't Pretty (But She Don't Swear None)"  – Liver Lips McGrowl
 "Mama, Don't Whip Little Buford"  – Henry and Wendell
 "Tears Will Be the Chaser For Your Wine"  – Trixie
 "How Long Will My Baby Be Gone"  – Terrence
 "All the Guys That Turn Me On Turn Me Down"  – The Sun Bonnet Trio
 "Heart, We Did All That We Could"  – Teddi Barra
 "Blood on the Saddle"  – Big Al
 "The Ballad of Davy Crockett"  – Henry and Sammy
 "Ole Slew Foot"  – Cast (minus Ernest and Trixie, who do not appear onstage, and Big Al, who reprises "Blood on the Saddle")
 "Come Again"  – Henry, Sammy, Max, Buff, and Melvin

Tokyo Disneyland version: 
 "Pianjo"  – Gomer and Henry
 "Bear Band Serenade"  – The Five Bear Rugs, Gomer, and Henry (sung in Japanese)
 "Fractured Folk Song" (Kenneth C. Burns & Henry D. Haynes) – Henry and Wendell (sung in Japanese)
 "My Woman Ain't Pretty (But She Don't Swear None)"  – Liver Lips McGrowl
 "Mama, Don't Whip Little Buford"  – Henry and Wendell (sung in Japanese)
 "Tears Will Be the Chaser For Your Wine"  – Trixie
 "Pretty Little Devilish Mary" (Bradley Kincaid) – The Five Bear Rugs
 "How Long Will My Baby Be Gone"  – Terrence
 "All the Guys That Turn Me On Turn Me Down"  – The Sun Bonnet Trio
 "If You Can't Bite, Don't Growl"  – Ernest and the Five Bear Rugs
 "Heart, We Did All That We Could"  – Teddi Barra
 "Blood on the Saddle"  – Big Al
 "The Ballad of Davy Crockett"  – Henry and Sammy (sung in Japanese)
 "Ole Slew Foot"  – Cast (minus Ernest and Trixie, who do not appear onstage, and Big Al, who reprises "Blood on the Saddle")
 "Come Again"  – Henry, Sammy, Max, Buff, and Melvin (sung in Japanese)

Christmas special

In 1984, the Disney Imagineers created the Country Bear Christmas Special. The show debuted at Disneyland at the Disneyland Resort and at Magic Kingdom at the Walt Disney World Resort in the winter of 1984, while marking the first time an attraction at any Disney theme park to ever receive a seasonal overlay. The show later premiered at Tokyo Disneyland at the Tokyo Disney Resort as Jingle Bell Jamboree during the 1988 Christmas season.

Vacation Hoedown

The Country Bear Vacation Hoedown was a summer overlay for the attraction. In Disneyland, it opened in February 1986 replacing the original show. That May, the Walt Disney World version followed suit. On July 15, 1994, the show opened at Tokyo Disneyland as Vacation Jamboree. It remained at Walt Disney World until February 1992 when the original show returned. At Disneyland however, the Hoedown remained until the Country Bear Playhouse closed on September 9, 2001.

In popular culture
 The Muppets at Walt Disney World, broadcast in May 1990, featured full-bodied walk-around versions of the characters during a scene with Fozzie Bear and his mom.

 The country bears made an appearance in the sing along songs videos Disneyland Fun (August 1990) and Campout at Walt Disney World (1994).

 Chuck E. Cheese restaurants were inspired by the Disneyland show to make their own animatronic musical show.

 The Simpsons has repeatedly referenced the show, with Homer commenting "It's like a freakin' Country Bear Jambaroo around here!"

 One of Terry Gilliam's animations from the British television series Monty Python's Flying Circus included Big Al (and Mickey Mouse) as one of a menagerie of animals getting shot in a safari and thrown into a cocktail shaker (Season 3, Episode 10: "E. Henry Thripshaws Disease").

 The television show The Critic has frequently parodied the bears and their show, including a reference where a Big Al lookalike stands in for an audioanimatronic Bill Clinton. From the same show, the character Duke Phillips has his own personal Country Bear Jamboree that sings in praise of him, which he accidentally activates when denouncing the belief that all southerners are country bumpkins.

 Fry mentions the show in the Futurama: The Beast with a Billion Backs, criticizing Leela for not liking it. In the show's episode, "The Series Has Landed," the Goofy Gopher Revue is also reminiscent of the attraction.

 A Goofy Movie contains an in-house parody of the show known as "Lester's Possum Park."

 In The Big Bang Theory, Sheldon wisecracks in response to Penny's awe over Wolowitz's mechanical robot arm, "At best, it’s a modest leap forward from the basic technology that gave us Country Bear Jamboree"  (Season 4 Episode 01 – The Robotic Manipulation).

 The 2002 Disney film The Country Bears is loosely based on the attraction and used the same characters.

 In the television show Last Man Standing episode "Adrenaline", Mike Baxter (Tim Allen) referenced the Bears saying "Now he gets to spend eternity with gentle Ben, bear Jesus, and most of the Country Bear Jamboree."

 The Hard Luck Bears has a similar version (but with different characters) seen in the UK and has different songs than the Disney version. The instruments for the jamboree was changed to match CEC's different bands.

Technical facts
There are five stages, numbered, from left to right, 1 & 2 (left wing), 3 (main stage), 4 and 5 (right wing). A cast of 18 audio-animatronic bears appear on the various stages and also rise up through the floor and drop from the ceiling. Stages 1, 2, 4 and 5 are actually turntables with two animatronics each fixed to them. As each scene finishes, the turntable revolves behind curtains and another character will be present on stage when the curtains open again, giving the impression that the performers have "moved" between stages. Approximately one third of each turntable is always visible to the guests, while the remaining two thirds emerge into a backstage area where maintenance can be carried out on the animatronics; even minor maintenance during shows if necessary, as there is approximately a 50-120 second turn around between scenes. The host bear, Henry, actually appears in the form of three separate figures during the show. The main stage has several backgrounds which descend on rails to provide a backdrop to the animatronics performing on the main stage. These backgrounds change when the main stage curtains are closed. The Five Bear Rugs are visible when there is no backdrop and it is their turn to perform. They are on a rolling platform that rolls forward during their part of the show. The rolling platform remains in Tokyo's version and changes seasonally from the Bandstand used in the Original show to the log used in the Vacation & Christmas show (the latter covering the top of the log in cotton to represent snow). Additional figures rise up from the stage floor and from the ceiling on hydraulic platforms when necessary.

See also
Country Bear Christmas Special
Country Bear Vacation HoedownThe Country Bears'' – 2002 movie based on the attraction, which retains the bears Henry, Ted, Zeb, Fred, Tennessee, Trixie, and Big Al, albeit changing their characters a bit.
List of former Disneyland attractions
Magic Kingdom attraction and entertainment history
Tokyo Disneyland attraction and entertainment history
List of Disney attractions using Audio-Animatronics

References

External links
 Magic Kingdom – Country Bear Jamboree
 Tokyo Disneyland – Country Bear Theater
 WDW Radio Country Bear Jamboree History, Stories and Trivia
 All Ears Net Country Bear Page
 Yesterland Country Bear page
 WDWHistory Country Bear Page

Amusement park attractions introduced in 1971
Amusement park attractions that closed in 2012
Amusement park attractions introduced in 2012
Amusement park attractions introduced in 1972
Amusement park attractions introduced in 1983
Amusement park attractions that closed in 2001
Western (genre) amusement rides
Walt Disney Parks and Resorts attractions
Magic Kingdom
Tokyo Disneyland
Frontierland
Critter Country
Audio-Animatronic attractions
Fictional bears
1971 establishments in Florida
1972 establishments in California
2001 disestablishments in California
1983 establishments in Japan